Timeline of anthropology, 1990–1999

Events
1990
NAGPRA, the Native American Graves Protection and Repatriation Act, is passed into US law

1991
"Ötzi the Iceman" discovered in the Alps

Publications

1991
Donald Brown's Human Universals was published
1992
Inalienable Possessions: The Paradox of Keeping-While-Giving by Annette B. Weiner
1994
Nightwork: Sexuality, Pleasure, and Corporate Masculinity in a Tokyo Hostess Club, by Anne Allison
1995
In Search of Respect: Selling Crack in El Barrio, by Philippe Bourgois
 The Development of Cognitive Anthropology, by Roy D'Andrade
1996
Permitted and Prohibited Desires: Mothers, Comics, and Censorship in Japan, by Anne Allison
1998
The Future of Us All: Race and Neighborhood Politics in New York City, by Roger Sandek
Envisioning Power: Ideologies of Dominance and Crisis, by Eric Wolf

Births

Deaths
1990
Kathleen Aberle
Michael Leiriss

1991
Cora Du Bois
Stanley Diamond
1993
Albert A. Dahlberg
Roger Keesing
Ronald Gofrey Lienhardt
Michael G. Smith
1994
Timothy Asch
Raymond Birdwhistell
Luther Cressman
Colin Turnbull

1995
Ernest Gellner
James Clyde Mitchell
David Schneider
Sol Tax
1996
Weston La Barre
Mary Leakey
Morris Opler
Elman Service
1997
John Adair
Michael Dorris
Alfred Gell
Roy Rappaport
1998
Carlos Castaneda
Louis Dumont
Alfonso Villa Rojas
1999
Arnold Epstein
Ashley Montagu
Eric Wolf

Awards
1990
Margaret Mead Award: Wenda Travathan
Victor Turner Prize: Kirin Narayan for Storytellers, Saints and Scoundrels: Folk Narrative and Hindu Religious Teaching

1991
Margaret Mead Award: Will Roscoe, for The Zuñi Man-Woman
Victor Turner Prize: Dennis Tedlock, for Days from a Dream Almanac
1993
Margaret Mead Award: Leo R. Chavez
1994
Margaret Mead Award: Katherine A. Dettwyler
1997
Margaret Mead Award: Philippe Bourgois
1998
Victor Turner Prize: Lawrence Cohen for No Aging in India: Alzheimer's, the Bad Family, and Other Modern Things
1999
Margaret Mead Award:Paul E. Farmer

References

Anthropology by decade
Anthropology
Anthropology timelines
1990s decade overviews
Anthropology